HMS Roberts was a Royal Navy  of the Second World War. She was the second monitor to be named after Field Marshal Frederick Roberts, 1st Earl Roberts.

Built by John Brown & Company, of Clydebank, she was laid down 30 April 1940, launched 1 April 1941 and completed on 27 October 1941. She reused the twin 15-inch gun turret of the First World War monitor .

Service history
Roberts provided bombardment support during Operation Torch in North Africa, where she was damaged by two  bombs in the Battle of Béjaïa. She was repaired in time to support Operation Husky (the invasion of Sicily) and the Allied landings near Salerno (Operation Avalanche). During the D-Day landings, she was controlled from the headquarters ship  also positioned off Sword beach. She also took part in the Walcheren operations.

In July 1945, Roberts departed the United Kingdom for the Indian Ocean to support Operation Mailfist, the planned liberation of Singapore. She was near Port Said at the time the Japanese surrender on 15 August, but was not recalled until 11 September by which time she had reached Kilindini Harbour in Kenya. She eventually reached Plymouth on 22 November.

Roberts was sold for scrap shortly after the war, but hired back by the navy as an accommodation ship at Devonport until 1965. She was sold for scrap again in July 1965, finally berthing at Thos. W. Ward in Inverkeithing for break up in early August.

One of Roberts guns (originally installed on the battleship ) is mounted outside the Imperial War Museum in Lambeth, south London, together with one from the battleship .

Notes

Hart, Stephen A. The Clearing of the Scheldt Estuary and the Liberation of Walcheren 2 October - 7 November 1944 Second World War 60th Anniversary, number 8, page 15. Central Office of Information, 2005.

References

Lenton, H.T. & Colledge, J. J. Warships of World War II, Ian Allan, London, 1973. 
Young, John. A Dictionary of Ships of the Royal Navy of the Second World War. Patrick Stephens Ltd, Cambridge, 1975. 
Hart, Stephen A. [https://assets.publishing.service.gov.uk/government/uploads/system/uploads/attachment_data/file/30060/ww2_scheldt_walcheren.pdf The Clearing of the Scheldt Estuary and the Liberation of Walcheren 2 October - 7 November 1944] Second World War 60th Anniversary No8 . Central Office of Information, 2005.

External links
HMS Roberts at www.uboat.net
Roberts Class Monitors at www.battleships-cruisers.co.uk

 

Roberts-class monitors
Ships built on the River Clyde
1941 ships
World War II monitors of the United Kingdom